Joseph Blake is the name of:
Joseph Blake (governor) (died 1700), English colonial administrator; governor of South Carolina
Joseph Blake (criminal) (1700–1724), English executed highwayman remembered in "Blueskin's Ballad" and other works
Joseph Blake, 1st Baron Wallscourt (1765–1803), Irish politician
Joseph Blake, 3rd Baron Wallscourt (1797–1849), Irish nobleman and propagator of socialist philosophy, nephew of the above
Joseph Henry Blake (chess player) (1859–1951), English chess grandmaster
Joe Blake (1882–1931), English footballer

See also
Blake (surname)